Sisu production is a Canadian media and film production. Sisu production provides customized film production, animation and photography services to independent clients. The company was founded in 2013 by Jaana Hein and Robin Ingle. sisu production maintains a dedicated studio in addition to corporate office space in downtown Toronto.

Sisu production works in different areas of film production and provides various media production services, including generating and developing ideas to a full range of production services. The company provides specialized services based on content requirements. In the past, they have produced commercials, training videos, photography, documentaries, and other media.

The origin of the name "sisu production" comes from the Finnish word sisu, meaning strength, endurance, and determination.

Notable productions
The company’s first production was a video feature for the 2013 International Travel & Health Insurance Conference (ITIJ) event in Vienna, Austria. Ingle International ended up winning the ITIJ Global Insurer/Underwrite of the year at the ITIC Industry event in Barcelona, where the video was shown.
 
In 2013, sisu production produced video features for the educational sector, at the 2013 Canadian Association of Public Schools – International (CAPS-I) Conference.

In 2014, sisu production collaborated with the Canadian Bureau of International Education at the annual conference in Ottawa, Ontario, Canada to provide video coverage of the event. sisu production also worked with CreativeMornings to produce a short film feature. In the same year, sisu production provided video coverage of the story of Roya Shams, an Afghan teenage girl who was funded by a Canadian charity campaign to obtain secondary and post-secondary education in Canada. Additionally, Google Canada collaborated with sisu production and Hand Eye Photography to produce two films for marketing purposes.

In 2014 and 2015, sisu production produced a promotional image movie for Enactus Canada, a Canadian non-for-profit foundation.

In 2016, sisu production won third place in TVO's short documentary contest for "I am a Doctor", directed by Jaana Hein. The movie explores the disparity between the job market Canada is promoting to immigrants versus the reality.

sisu production has also collaborated with Novus Health, a health navigation platform, to create bilingual animations and commercials for Novus Health, as well as for their clients. sisu has also worked with VarageSale, a Canadian startup, to produce website animation.

References

External links
 sisu production Official Website
 sisu production Vimeo page
 Jaana Hein, founder of sisu production

Film production companies of Canada
Companies based in Toronto
Privately held companies of Canada
Video production companies